The Uganda Boxing Federation (UBF) is the body mandated to organise, promote and develop the sport of boxing in Uganda as stipulated in the sports Act of 1964 and other subsequent sports related rules and regulations in Uganda. The UBF was founded in 1950 and is affiliated to the International Boxing Association.

Location
The Uganda Boxing Federation headquarters is located on Plot 2-10 Coronation Avenue, Lugogo Sports Complex in Kampala District.

Organisation
Uganda Boxing is an affiliate member of the National Sports Council, Uganda Olympic Committee, African Boxing Union and the International Boxing Association.
The federation has 47 affiliated clubs, 10 provisional clubs and over 300 unregistered boxing clubs. 

Since January 2018, Moses Muhangi has been serving as the federation president.

Partnerships
In the 2022, Uganda national boxing team "the Bombers" competed in the 2022 Commonwealth Games which took place in United Kingdom.

Probellum, a global boxing company in 2021 signed a partnership with the Uganda Boxing Federation to develop talented amateur fighters in Uganda and give them a platform to showcase their abilities on a global level.. 

In December 2021, UBF signed a partnership with Next Media Services to broadcast live the inaugural Uganda Boxing Champions League on NBS Television. 

In June 2022, Crown Beverages Limited under the energy drink Sting partnered with Uganda Boxing Federation with a sponsorship package of USD 75000.

IBA President visits Uganda
On 2nd December 2022, the President of the International Boxing Association, Umar Nazarovich Kremlev, paid a one-day visit to Uganda where he launched the construction of a boxing academy in the country.

References

External links
 Official Website
 Uganda Boxing Federation (UBF) | National Council of Sports
 The Return of Boxing, UBF Introduces new Competition dubbed Champions League | Voice of Bugerere
 COMMONWEALTH GAMES: Uganda to send 6 boxers to Birmingham games
 Uganda Boxing Federation president Muhangi wins unopposed second term
 Sting boosts Uganda Boxing Champions League with Shs285m
 New Boxing Federation President Muhangi Reveals His Three Priorities

International sports organizations
Sports organisations of Uganda
Sports organizations established in 1950
1950 establishments in Uganda